Santa Rita is a district of the Río Cuarto canton, in the Alajuela province of Costa Rica.

History 
Santa Rita was created on 11 October 2018 by Acuerdo Ejecutivo N°044-2018-MGP.

Geography 
Santa Rita has an area of  km² and an elevation of  metres.

Settlements 
The eponymous Santa Rita village is its head village, and it also encompasses the villages of Ángeles Norte, Flor, La Trinidad, Montelirio, Naranjales, Peoresnada, San Gerardo (partially) and Tabla.

Demographics 

For the 2011 census, Santa Rita had not been created, its inhabitants were part of Río Cuarto canton when it was a district of Grecia canton.

Transportation

Road transportation 
The district is covered by the following road routes:
 National Route 4
 National Route 744
 National Route 745

References 

Districts of Alajuela Province
Populated places in Alajuela Province